Washington Shirley, 8th Earl Ferrers (13 November 1760 – 2 October 1842), styled Hon. Washington Shirley from 1778 to 1827, was a British nobleman.

The third son of Robert Shirley, 6th Earl Ferrers, he was educated at Westminster School. On 19 May 1780, he was appointed a cupbearer in the Royal Household, but this sinecure was abolished on 14 November 1782.

Shirley married Frances (d. 4 March 1812), daughter of Rev. William Ward and granddaughter of William Ward, on 24 July 1781 at Gretna Green. They had one son and two daughters:
Lady Frances Shirley (23 March 1782 – 5 February 1834), unmarried
Robert William Shirley, Viscount Tamworth (24 August 1783 – 2 February 1830), married Anne Weston on 12 December 1821, by whom he had two sons and a daughter:
Hon. Rosamond Anne Myrtle Shirley (25 September 1818 – 2 April 1865), married Hon. Henry Hanbury-Tracy on 19 January 1841
Washington Sewallis Shirley, 9th Earl Ferrers (1822–1859)
Lt. Hon. Robert William Devereux Shirley (14 December 1825 – 4 June 1849), 87th Foot
Julia Anne Shirley (6 February 1785 – 23 November 1825)

After the death of his first wife, Ferrers married Sarah Davy (d. 30 June 1835) on 28 September 1829. They had no children.

As his nephew had predeceased him without legitimate issue, Washington succeeded his elder brother in the earldom in 1827. On 13 July 1832, he was appointed a deputy lieutenant of Leicestershire. He died at Chartley on 2 October 1842 aged 81 and was buried at Staunton Harold.

References

1760 births
1842 deaths
Deputy Lieutenants of Leicestershire
08
People educated at Westminster School, London